Moment of Impact may refer to:

 Moment of Impact (album), an album by Eye Empire
 Moment of Impact (film), a 1998 American documentary film